Arundinaria is a genus of bamboo in the grass family the members of which are referred to generally as cane. Arundinaria is the only bamboo native to North America, with a native range from Maryland south to Florida and west to the southern Ohio Valley and Texas.
Within this region Arundinaria canes are found from the Coastal Plain to medium elevations in the Appalachian Mountains.

Prior to the European colonization of the Americas, cane was an important resource for indigenous peoples of the Americas. Early European explorers in the U.S. described vast monotypic stands of Arundinaria that were common in river lowlands and covered hundreds of thousands of hectares. In the modern era, Arundinaria canebrakes are small and isolated, but there has been interest in restoring them due to the cultural and ecological importance of the plant. Canebrakes provided land for crops, habitat for wild game, and year-round forage for livestock. The cane itself was used for construction, weapons, jewelry, medicines, fuel, and food. Canebrakes declined significantly after colonization due to clearing, farming and fire suppression.

Description 
Arundinaria produce seeds only rarely and usually reproduce vegetatively, forming large clonal genets. When seed production does occur, the colony usually dies afterwards, possibly because the dense thickets of a mature canebrake would otherwise prevent seedling establishment. Only two flowering events are known for A. appalachiana. A colony of cane will expand rapidly using asexual reproduction following disturbances, particularly fire, which triggers new shoots to immediately sprout from the underground rhizomes after the aboveground part of the plant has burned. These shoots grow quickly, up to 1.5 inches per day. Among the distinctive features of the canes is a fan-like cluster of leaves at the top of new stems called a topknot, so-called because of its resemblance to topknot hairstyles.

Accepted species 
There are currently three recognized species of the genus Arundinaria accepted by the World Checklist of Selected Plant Families as of March 2016. For each species listed below, binomial name is followed by author citation.

Conservation 
The organization Revitalization of Traditional Cherokee Artisan Resources, using funding from the Cherokee Preservation Foundation, has helped establish restoration sites for Arundinaria gigantea.

Use 
Ethnobotanists consider cane to have been extremely important to Native Americans in the Southeastern Woodlands before European colonisation. The plant was used to make structures, arrow shafts, weapons, fishing equipment, jewelry, baskets, musical instruments, furniture, boats, pipe stems, and medicines. Arundinaria gigantea, or river cane, has historically been used to construct Native American flutes, particularly among tribes of the Eastern Woodlands. The Atakapa, Muscogee Creek, Chickasaw, Choctaw, Cherokee, and other Southeastern tribes have traditionally used this material for mat and basket weaving, and the Chitimacha and Eastern Band Cherokee still widely weave with rivercane today, though basket makers have started making smaller baskets in order to use less material and preserve the increasingly rare river cane. Bean poles made from dried canes can last for several years if properly stored when not in use.

Food uses include flour, cereal, and even "asparagus" of young shoots; however, caution should be used whenever foraging for cane seeds, as the extremely toxic fungus Ergot (Claviceps spp.) can colonize its seeds as well as those of the common cereals. Ergot-infected plants will have pink or purplish blotches or growths about the size of a seed or several times larger.

Medicinally, the Choctaw use the roots for their painkilling properties.

Systematics 
Two of the three species currently placed in the genus, Arundinaria gigantea and Arundinaria tecta, were first described scientifically by Thomas Walter in his 1788 Flora Caroliniana. Walter placed them in the grass genus Arundo. In 1803, the French botanist André Michaux, unaware of the flora prepared by Walter, also published a description of the canes he encountered. Michaux recognised only one species, but created a new monotypic genus for it: Arundinaria macrosperma Michx..  The name of the genus he used is derived from the same Latin word used by Walter for the plants he described; namely arundo, meaning "reed".

Despite the work done by Walter and Michaux, subsequent researchers had difficulty interpreting their circumscriptions of species boundaries. Walter designated no type specimens, and his Latin protologues that describe the species are vague, including features that could be any of the three species currently recognized. Michaux did designate a type specimen for the species he described, but it does not include enough of the plant to determine with confidence which species it represents, while his protologues were likewise not detailed enough to avoid ambiguity. In 2009, epitypes, a new form of  botanical type allowed by the International Code of Botanical Nomenclature in order to clarify older ambiguous types, were designated for Arundo gigantea Walt. and Arundinaria macrosperma Michx.. This allows current and future researchers to know precisely what is being discussed when the scientific names applied to these plants are used.

Taxonomic history 
The genus Arundinaria has a complex taxonomic history spanning over two centuries. The canes of the southeastern U.S. were originally described as two species of reed grasses in the genus Arundo by Thomas Walter in 1788. André Michaux, working in 1803 and unaware of Walter's work, correctly interpreted the canes as a distinct group and created the genus Arundinaria with one species. However, neither of these researchers left enough information to their successors, leading to confusion surrounding the identity of the species they had described. A decade later in 1813, G.H.E. Muhlenberg noticed the affinities between the two previous authors' work and transferred Walter's two species to Michaux's new genus, yielding a combinatio nova for each, namely Arundinaria gigantea (Walt.) Muhl. and Arundinaria tecta (Walt.) Muhl.. Muhlenberg considered the genus to consist of these two species in addition to Arundinaria macrosperma Michx..

The phenotypic diversity of the American Arundinaria bamboos subsequently led to a variety of taxonomic treatments, with some authors arguing that only the North American species should be included, while others included dozens of Asian species otherwise considered members of other genera (Bashania, Oligostachyum, Sarocalamus, Fargesia, Sasa, etc.). Even African bamboos were placed in Arundinaria under broad concepts for the group. Some outdated systems during this era assigned Arundinaria more than 400 species.

A. S. Hitchcock reviewed the taxonomic state of the North American bamboos in 1951. He interpreted Michaux's Arundinaria macrosperma Michx. as a synonym of Walter's Arundinaria gigantea (Walt.) Muhl., reducing the genus to two species. By the late 20th century, Floyd Alonzo McClure's 1973 survey of Arundinaria was also considered authoritative, and included only one species, Arundinaria gigantea. Most recently, in 2006 researchers from Iowa State University and the University of North Carolina recognised and described a third species, Arundinaria appalachiana Triplett, Weakley & L.G. Clark. The plants that form this species were previously thought to form part of the natural genetic diversity of Arundinaria gigantea (Walt.) Muhl., but upon in depth analysis using modern phylogenetic methods based on morphology and amplified fragment length polymorphisms, the researchers determined that the canes form three species.Phylogenetic studies in 2006 using molecular and morphological evidence have suggested that the genus forms three natural species confined to the southeastern United States.

See also 
Canebrakes

References

External links 
 Description of Arundinaria

Bambusoideae
Bambusoideae genera
Flora of the United States
Native American culture
Plants used in traditional Native American medicine